Copenhagen is a village in Lewis County, New York, United States. The village is situated between Watertown and Lowville. The population was 631 at the 2020 census. The village is named after Copenhagen, the capital of Denmark.

Copenhagen is in the town of Denmark and is northwest of Lowville.

History 
Copenhagen was formerly known as "Mungers Mills".

Pinckney Corners Cemetery was listed on the National Register of Historic Places in 2014.

Geography
Copenhagen is located in the western part of the town of Denmark at  (43.893078, -75.672474). The Deer River, a tributary of the Black River, flows through the village. The river passes over High Falls at the eastern border of the village.

Copenhagen is on New York State Route 12, Main Street, south of the Jefferson County line. Route 12 leads northwest  to Watertown and southeast  to Lowville, the Lewis county seat.

Demographics

As of the census of 2000, there were 865 people, 318 households, and 237 families residing in the village. The population density was 720.0 people per square mile (278.3/km2). There were 383 housing units at an average density of 318.8 per square mile (123.2/km2). The racial makeup of the village was 94.91% White, 1.27% African American, 0.23% Native American, 1.85% from other races, and 1.73% from two or more races. Hispanic or Latino of any race were 2.77% of the population.

There were 318 households, out of which 42.8% had children under the age of 18 living with them, 57.2% were married couples living together, 11.6% had a female householder with no husband present, and 25.2% were non-families. 21.4% of all households were made up of individuals, and 10.7% had someone living alone who was 65 years of age or older. The average household size was 2.72 and the average family size was 3.14.

In the village, the population was spread out, with 31.8% under the age of 18, 13.3% from 18 to 24, 31.8% from 25 to 44, 15.1% from 45 to 64, and 8.0% who were 65 years of age or older. The median age was 28 years. For every 100 females, there were 97.5 males. For every 100 females age 18 and over, there were 91.6 males.

The median income for a household in the village was $32,273, and the median income for a family was $35,781. Males had a median income of $30,147 versus $25,156 for females. The per capita income for the village was $12,780. About 10.8% of families and 13.4% of the population were below the poverty line, including 19.0% of those under age 18 and 15.2% of those age 65 or over.

For the population 25 years and over in Copenhagen:

High school or higher: 84.1% 
Bachelor's degree or higher: 9.7% 
Graduate or professional degree: 1.3% 
Unemployed: 9.4% 
Mean travel time to work: 22.7 minutes 
For population 15 years and over in Copenhagen village

Never married: 24.1% 
Now married: 59.2% 
Separated: 4.4% 
Widowed: 6.2% 
Divorced: 6.2%

Population change in the 1990s: -14 (-1.6%).

Most common industries for males (%):

Public administration (20%) 
Construction (11%) 
Paper (9%) 
Agriculture, forestry, fishing and hunting (7%) 
Educational services (5%) 
Food and beverage stores (4%) 
Truck transportation (4%)

Most common industries for females (%):

Educational services (17%) 
Health care (17%) 
Public administration (12%) 
Food and beverage stores (10%) 
Accommodation and food services (8%) 
Department and other general merchandise stores (5%) 
Social assistance (5%)

Most common occupations for males: (%)

Law enforcement workers including supervisors (9%) 
Vehicle and mobile equipment mechanics, installers, and repairers (9%) 
Other production occupations including supervisors (7%) 
Electrical equipment mechanics and other installation, maintenance, and repair occupations including supervisors (6%) 
Agricultural workers including supervisors (6%) 
Driver/sales workers and truck drivers (6%) 
Other management occupations except farmers and farm managers (5%)

Most common occupations for females (%)

Cashiers (13%) 
Secretaries and administrative assistants (8%) 
Information and record clerks except customer service representatives (8%) 
Health technologists and technicians (7%) 
Other management occupations except farmers and farm managers (7%) 
Waiters and waitresses (4%) 
Child care workers (3%)

References

External links
  Copenhagen, NY schools

Villages in New York (state)
Villages in Lewis County, New York